Caswell House may refer to:

Caswell House (Troy, Michigan), listed on the National Register of Historic Places in Oakland County, Michigan
Daniel H. and William T. Caswell Houses, Austin, Texas, listed on the NRHP in Travis County, Texas
Caswell House (Georgetown, Texas), listed on the National Register of Historic Places in Williamson County, Texas
Caswell–Taylor House, formerly listed on the National Register of Historic Places in Knox County, Tennessee